Donald Bruce Poile (born June 1, 1932) is a Canadian former professional ice hockey player who played 67 games in the National Hockey League with the Detroit Red Wings between 1954 and 1958. The rest of his career, which lasted from 1952 to 1962, was mainly spent with the Edmonton Flyers of the Western Hockey League. He was born in Fort William, Ontario, and is the brother of Hall of Famer Bud Poile.

Career statistics

Regular season and playoffs

References
 

1932 births
Living people
Canadian ice hockey centres
Detroit Red Wings players
Edmonton Flyers (WHL) players
Hershey Bears players
Ice hockey people from Ontario
Milwaukee Chiefs players
Sportspeople from Thunder Bay